North Naples is an unincorporated community in northwest Collier County, Florida, United States, located immediately north of Naples. The North Naples area includes the census-designated places of Naples Park, Pelican Bay, and Pine Ridge, as well as additional surrounding land.

North Naples is part of the Naples–Marco Island Metropolitan Statistical Area.

History

Geography

Principal communities

 Naples Park
 Pelican Marsh
 Coco River
 Vanderbilt Beach
 Pine Ridge
 Pelican Bay

Climate
North Naples has a tropical climate with warm dry winters and hot humid summers with heavy rain, despite it being north of the tropics.  It is a part of one of the only tropical climates in the continental USA.

Education 
North Naples is served by the District School Board of Collier County and various private institutions including the following.

Elementary 
 Pelican Marsh Elementary School (public)
 Naples Park Elementary School (public)
 Laurel Oaks Elementary School (public)
 Veterans Memorial Elementary School (public)
 The Village School (private)

Middle 
 North Naples Middle School (public)
 The Village School (private)
 Pine Ridge Middle School (public)
 Oakridge Middle School (public)

High 
 Barron Collier High School (public)
 Gulf Coast High School (public)

Public transportation
North Naples is served by Collier Area Transit's 2A, 2B, 6, and 10 routes.

Healthcare 
North Naples is served by North Naples Hospital, part of the NCH system.

References

External links
 northnaplesfire.com
collierschools.com/nnm

Unincorporated communities in Collier County, Florida
Unincorporated communities in Florida
Populated coastal places in Florida on the Gulf of Mexico
Former census-designated places in Florida